Androzelma gigas is a species of beetle in the family Carabidae, the only species in the genus Androzelma.

References

Scaritinae